This is a list of cricket players who have played representative cricket for Uva in Sri Lanka.

It includes players that have played at least one match, in senior First-Class, List A cricket, or Twenty20 matches. Practice matches are not included, unless they have officially been classified at First-class tour matches.

The Inter-Provincial Cricket Tournament is the premier domestic cricket competition in Sri Lanka. It was founded in 1990, however the Uva cricket team only participated in the 2003-04 edition called the 2003-04 Ten Sports Inter-Provincial Tournament. Uva have yet to play any Twenty20 cricket.

First Class Players
All of the cricket players who have represented Uva in first class cricket in order of their appearance for the team:

List 'A' Players
All of the cricket players who have represented Uva in List A cricket in order of their appearance for the team:

Twenty20 Players
Uva is yet to play any Twenty20 domestic competitions.

External links
Players Who Have Played For Uva
Sri Lanka Cricket

 
Uva